

History
The NESCAC tournament began in 2000 after the nine NESCAC left ECAC East to for the ice hockey division for their primary conference. The tournament has been held annually ever since with the winner receiving a bid to the Division III National Tournament. The 2021 tournament was cancelled due to the COVID-19 pandemic.

2000

Note: Middlebury served as host for the Semifinal and Championship rounds.

Note: * denotes overtime period(s)

2001

Note: Middlebury served as host for the Semifinal and Championship rounds.

Note: * denotes overtime period(s)

2002

Note: Middlebury served as host for the Semifinal and Championship rounds.

Note: * denotes overtime period(s)

2003

Note: Middlebury served as host for the Semifinal and Championship rounds.

Note: * denotes overtime period(s)

2004

Note: Middlebury served as host for the Semifinal and Championship rounds.

Note: * denotes overtime period(s)

2005

Note: Trinity served as host for the Semifinal and Championship rounds.

Note: * denotes overtime period(s)

2006

Note: Middlebury served as host for the Semifinal and Championship rounds.

Note: * denotes overtime period(s)

2007

Note: Bowdoin served as host for the Semifinal and Championship rounds.

Note: * denotes overtime period(s)

2008

Note: Colby served as host for the Semifinal and Championship rounds.

Note: * denotes overtime period(s)

2009

Note: Amherst served as host for the Semifinal and Championship rounds.

Note: * denotes overtime period(s)

2010

Note: Bowdoin served as host for the Semifinal and Championship rounds.

Note: * denotes overtime period(s)

2011

Note: Williams served as host for the Semifinal and Championship rounds.

Note: * denotes overtime period(s)

2012

Note: Amherst served as host for the Semifinal and Championship rounds.

Note: * denotes overtime period(s)

2013

Note: Bowdoin served as host for the Semifinal and Championship rounds.

Note: * denotes overtime period(s)

2014

Note: Trinity served as host for the Semifinal and Championship rounds.

Note: * denotes overtime period(s)

2015

Note: Amherst served as host for the Semifinal and Championship rounds.

Note: * denotes overtime period(s)

2016

Note: Trinity served as host for the Semifinal and Championship rounds.

Note: * denotes overtime period(s)

2017

Note: Hamilton served as host for the Semifinal and Championship rounds.

Note: * denotes overtime period(s)

2018

Note: Trinity served as host for the Semifinal and Championship rounds.

Note: * denotes overtime period(s)

2019

Note: Trinity served as host for the Semifinal and Championship rounds.

Note: * denotes overtime period(s)

2020

Note: Williams served as host for the Semifinal and Championship rounds.

Note: * denotes overtime period(s)

2022

Note: Colby served as host for the Semifinal and Championship rounds.

Note: * denotes overtime period(s)

2023

Note: Amherst served as host for the Semifinal and Championship rounds.

Note: * denotes overtime period(s)

Championships

See also
ECAC East Men's Tournament

References

External links

NCAA Division III ice hockey
New England Small College Athletic Conference
Recurring sporting events established in 2000